The secretary-general of ASEAN is the chief administrative officer of the Association of Southeast Asian Nations (ASEAN). The secretary-general must come from an ASEAN member state and will be appointed during the ASEAN Summit based on the alphabetical order of member states. The term of office is five years.

List of secretaries-general

References

 
Secretaries-General of ASEAN
Southeast Asian Nations